Calvin M. Dooley (born January 11, 1954), American politician, was a Democratic member of the United States House of Representatives from 1991 to 2005, representing the 17th and 20th districts of California.

Early life and education 
Born in Visalia, California, he grew up on his parents' farm several miles east of Hanford and graduated from Hanford Union High School in 1972. Dooley earned his bachelor's degree in agricultural economics from the University of California, Davis in 1977 and a master's degree in Management from Stanford University in 1987.

Career 
Dooley worked as a rancher and then as an administrative assistant for California State Senator Rose Ann Vuich from 1987 to 1990.

U.S. House of Representatives 
In 1990, Dooley won the Democratic primary for what was then the 17th District and faced six-term Republican Chip Pashayan in November. Although Pashayan had been reelected with 71 percent of the vote in 1988, he was bogged down by the House banking scandal, and Dooley defeated him by just over 9 points. In 1992, his district was renumbered as the 20th District and drawn as a Latino-majority district. He was easily reelected that year and five more times after that. He faced only one truly serious contest, when Republican Rich Rodriguez managed to hold him to 53 percent of the vote. A "New Democrat," his voting record was considered moderate, as is typical for Democrats from the Central Valley.

Dooley announced his retirement in 2004 and endorsed his chief of staff, Lisa Quigley, as his successor. However, most of the rest of the state Democratic establishment endorsed Jim Costa, a former state legislator from the Fresno area. This touched off a contentious primary battle which was won by Costa, all but assuring him of victory in November. 
On October 10, 2002, Cal Dooley was among the 81 House Democrats who voted in favor of authorizing the invasion of Iraq. He has later said that he regrets this vote.

Later career 
Having served as the president and CEO of the Food Products Association (FPA), Dooley assumed the same roles at the Grocery Manufacturers Association (GMA), following a merger with the FPA. GMA is a Washington-based trade association representing food manufacturers.

In September 2008, Dooley assumed the position of CEO of the American Chemistry Council, the trade association for American chemical companies. He announced his retirement in 2018.

Personal life 
Dooley is married to the former Linda Phillips, who heads the Bryce Harlow Foundation in Washington DC. The couple have two daughters, one of whom is on the Charlottesville City School Board.

References

External links

American Chemistry Council Leadership Biography

|-

|-

|-

1954 births
21st-century American politicians
American chief executives
American lobbyists
Democratic Party members of the United States House of Representatives from California
Information Technology and Innovation Foundation
Living people
People from Visalia, California
Stanford University alumni
University of California, Davis alumni
Members of Congress who became lobbyists